Con el culo al aire is a Spanish television sitcom set in a camping site. Comprising 3 seasons and 42 episodes, it aired from February 2012 to July 2014 on Antena 3.

Premise 
The fiction follows the mishaps of a group of people living in an urban camping site in La Cabrera, in the north of the Madrid region.

Cast 
 Paco Tous as Tino.
 María León as Sandra.
 Toni Acosta as Sonsoles.
 Raúl Arévalo as Jorge.
  as Ángel.
  as Alicia.
  as Dulce.
  as Lola.
 Hiba Abouk as Candela.
 Víctor Palmero as Dani.
  as José Luis.
  as Serafín.
  as Juana.
 Vicente Romero as Chema.
 Carmen Ruiz as Eli.
 Jesse Johnson as Bobby.
Introduced in season 2
  as Paulino.
 Ana Wagener as Charo.
  as Roberto
Introduced in season 3
  as Chus.
 Julián López as Rubén.
 Ana Morgade as Begoña.

Production and release 
Produced by Grupo Vértice 360's Notro TV, the 13-episode first season premiered Antena 3 on 1 February 2012 and it and ended airing on 16 May 2012, averaging 3,211,000 viewers and a 17.3% audience share. The second season (also featuring 13 episodes), aired from to 17 April 2013 to 10 July 2013, roughly maintained the viewership figures of the first season, with 3,035,000 viewers and a 17.0% share. The series' viewership figures experienced a decrease in the third and final season (aired from 12 March 2014 to 16 July 2014), with 2,417,000 viewers and a 13.5% audience share averaged across its 16 episodes, slightly above the channel's average.

Awards and nominations 

|-
| align = "center" | 2013 || 63rd Fotogramas de Plata || Best TV Actor || Raúl Arévalo ||  || 
|-
| align = "center" | 2014 || 64th Fotogramas de Plata || Best TV Actor || Raúl Arévalo ||  || 
|}

References 

2010s sitcoms
2010s Spanish comedy television series
2012 Spanish television series debuts
2014 Spanish television series endings
Antena 3 (Spanish TV channel) network series
Spanish-language television shows
Spanish television sitcoms
Television shows filmed in Spain
Television shows set in the Community of Madrid